Tullio Altamura (born 18 July 1924) is an Italian actor, best known for his roles in spaghetti westerns and action films in the 1960s.

Life and career 
Born in Bologna, the son of a career officer in the Italian army, Altamura grew up in Rome, where he studied at the liceo classico. After having worked for some time as a freelance journalist, he started his professional acting career in the first half of 1950s. Starting from the 1960s he specialized in villain roles in genre films, in which he often adopted the stage name Tor Altmayer. Active on television from 1957 and on stage from 1961, he was also a television writer and documentarist.

Filmography 
Il cardinale Lambertini, directed by Giorgio Pàstina (1954)
Il conte Aquila, directed by Guido Salvini (1955)
L'isola del tesoro, directed by Anton Giulio Majano (1959) - Tv
Ottocento, directed by Anton Giulio Majano (1959) - Tv
I figli di Medea, directed by Anton Giulio Majano (1959) - Tv
Seddok, l'erede di Satana, directed by Anton Giulio Majano (1960)
Audace colpo dei soliti ignoti, directed by Nanni Loy (1960)
La lunga notte del '43, directed by Florestano Vancini (1960)
Labbra rosse, directed by Giuseppe Bennati (1960)
I tre nemici, directed by Giorgio Simonelli (1962)
Zorro alla corte di Spagna, directed by Luigi Capuano (1962)
Ercole contro i tiranni di Babilonia, directed by Domenico Paolella (1964)
Il colosso di Roma, directed by Giorgio Ferroni (1964)
 Sonaron cuatro balazos, directed by Agustín Navarro (1964)
Un dollaro bucato, directed by Giorgio Ferroni (1965)
Rififi ad Amsterdam, directed by Sergio Grieco (1966)
 Assault on the State Treasure, directed by Piero Pierotti (1967)
 Danger!! Death Ray, directed byGianfranco Baldanello (1967)
Marinai in coperta, directed by Bruno Corbucci (1967)
Dick smart 2.007, directed by Franco Prosperi (1967)
L'uomo del colpo perfetto, directed by Aldo Florio (1967)
La morte non ha sesso, directed by Massimo Dallamano (1968)
Le calde notti di Poppea, directed by Guido Malatesta (1969)
Diario di un maestro, directed by Vittorio De Seta (1972) - Tv
Libera, amore mio..., directed by Mauro Bolognini (1973)
Bachi da seta, directed by Gilberto Visintin (1988)

References

External links 
 

1924 births
Possibly living people
20th-century Italian male actors
Italian male film actors
Italian male stage actors
Italian male television actors
Male Spaghetti Western actors